Kristin A. Conzet (born November 18, 1970) is an American politician and a Republican member of the South Dakota House of Representatives representing District 32 since December 3, 2009.

Elections
2010 Conzet ran in the three-way June 5, 2012 Republican Primary and placed second with 1,148 votes (37.4%); in the three-way November 6, 2012 General election, Conzet took the first seat with 5,004 votes (36.21%) and incumbent Representative Brian Gosch took the second seat ahead of Democratic nominee Jackie Swanson.
2009When incumbent District 32 Republican Representative Brian Dreyer left the Legislature and left a District 32 seat open, Conzet and incumbent Representative Brian Gosch were unopposed for the June 8, 2010 Republican Primary and won the four-way November 2, 2010 General election, where Representative Gosch took the first seat and Conzet took the second seat with 4,221 votes (31.05%) ahead of Independent candidates Mathew Murray and Jeanette Deurloo.

References

External links
Official page at the South Dakota Legislature
 

Place of birth missing (living people)
Living people
Republican Party members of the South Dakota House of Representatives
Politicians from Rapid City, South Dakota
Women state legislators in South Dakota
1970 births
21st-century American politicians
21st-century American women politicians